Saif Khalfan Saeed Al-Maqbaali (Arabic:سيف خلفان) (born 31 January 1993) is an Emirati footballer who plays as a centre back.

External links

References

Emirati footballers
1993 births
Living people
Al Jazira Club players
Emirates Club players
Footballers at the 2014 Asian Games
UAE Pro League players
UAE First Division League players
Association football defenders
Asian Games competitors for the United Arab Emirates